Anywhere but Home is the first live album and concert DVD release by American rock band Evanescence. It was released on November 23, 2004, by Wind-up Records. It includes a recording of a concert at Le Zénith in Paris, an hour of behind the scenes footage, three previously-unreleased songs, and all four of the Fallen music videos.

Background

Anywhere but Home was filmed during Evanescence's concert at Le Zénith in Paris on May 25, 2004. The tour supported their debut album Fallen (2003) and every song from that album except "Hello" was performed at that show. Three new songs were released on Anywhere but Home: "Missing", "Breathe No More" (which was featured on the soundtrack to the 2005 film Elektra), and "Farther Away". While placed at the end of the disc, the CD insert shows "Missing" as track eight but it is actually track 14 and incorrectly labeled "Whisper".

Controversy
In December 2004, Trevin and Melanie Skeens of Maryland, who had bought the album for their thirteen-year-old daughter, filed a class action lawsuit against Wal-Mart after hearing the word "fuck" sung during the song "Thoughtless", a cover of a Korn song. The lawsuit claimed that while the album contained this explicit word, there was no Parental Advisory sticker on the package. It also claimed that this album violated Wal-Mart's policy of not stocking music with explicit lyrics, and that the company had to be aware of the problem because the word was dubbed out of a free sample on the Walmart.com website. The lawsuit was resolved by court order of a deal which would allow those people who bought the album at a Maryland Wal-Mart location to receive a refund. Some copies have the Parental Advisory notice, yet other copies are still sold without it now.

Extras
A secret performance of "Bring Me to Life" in Las Vegas, Nevada can be found on the DVDs main menu by moving the cursor to the largest thorn on the left-hand side of the screen. The band symbol then becomes visible. When selected, this will take the user to the hidden footage.

Reception

Johny Loftus of AllMusic deemed the album a "fine holdover" until the band's second studio album, and stated that it "reasserts Amy Lee's position at Evanescence's center" while she was "always the singular force" of Evanescence, with her "powerful vocals, strident public persona, and striking fashion sense [breaking] down the doors of the alternative metal boys club." He further praised Lee's vocals and engagement with the crowd. Geoff Barton of Classic Rock graded Anywhere but Home with four out of five stars. 

On the Billboard 200, the album debuted at number 39 on December 11, 2004, selling 59,000 copies in its first week. On the Spanish DVD Chart, Anywhere but Home debuted at number one for the week ending November 28, 2004; it became the best-selling music DVD of 2004 in Spain.

Track listing

CD

DVD

Concert 
58 minutes
 "Haunted (intro)"
 "Haunted"
 "Going Under"
 "Taking Over Me"
 "Everybody's Fool"
 "Thoughtless" (Korn cover)
 "My Last Breath"
 "Farther Away"
 "Breathe No More"
 "My Immortal"
 "Bring Me to Life"
 "Tourniquet"
 "Imaginary"
 "Whisper"

Music videos 
17 minutes
 "My Immortal"
 "Everybody's Fool"
 "Bring Me to Life"
 "Going Under"

Behind the scenes 
1 hour
 "Life on the Road"
 "Showtime"
 "Bloopers"
 "Evanescence Unleashed"
 End credits: "Missing"

Extra 
5 minutes
 "Bring Me to Life" (Live in Las Vegas, included as an easter egg)

Personnel
 Amy Lee – vocals, piano
 Rocky Gray – drums
 John LeCompt – guitar, vocals on "Bring Me to Life"
 Terry Balsamo – guitar
 William Boyd – bass

Charts

Weekly charts
Album

Video

Year-end charts
Video

Album

Certifications

! colspan="3"| Album
|-

! colspan="3"| Video
|-

Notes

References

2004 live albums
2004 video albums
Albums produced by Dave Fortman
Alternative metal video albums
Evanescence albums
Live alternative metal albums
Live video albums
Wind-up Records live albums
Wind-up Records video albums